Summer vacation is a school holiday in summer between school years.

Summer Vacation may also refer to:

 Summer Vacation 1999, a 1988 Japanese romance film
 Hotel Transylvania 3: Summer Vacation, a 2018 animated American film
 "Summer Vacation", a song from the 1990 album The Party
 Summer Vacation (TV series), a 2020 South Korean reality show
 LEGO Star Wars Summer Vacation, a 2022 television special

See also 
 Summer Vacation in SMTown.com, a series of albums by SM Town